Dvbbs (stylized in all caps; pronounced "dubs") is a Canadian production duo formed in 2012, composed of brothers Christopher van den Hoef and Alexandre van den Hoef.

History

Career
Christopher and Alexandre Van den Hoef are natives of Orangeville, Ontario. Their father is Dutch and migrated to Canada, and their mother is Greek Canadian. The two DJs lived in Athens, Greece for two years. They are currently based in Los Angeles, California, as well as  Toronto, Ontario, and are signed with Josh Herman at STRVCTVRE Artist Management.

DVBBS spent two months recording their debut extended play, Initio, released in March 2012. The EP features influences from a variety of genres, including house, electronic, dubstep and reggae.

Following their 2012 debut EP, ‘Initio,’ DVBBS gained international acclaim via their chart-topping single, “Tsunami,” in 2013. As the duo’s first-ever certified hit, the platinum-selling “Tsunami” today counts over 1 billion streams. The 2014 vocal mix of the track, “Tsunami (Jump)” featuring English rapper Tinie Tempah, topped both the UK Singles and UK Dance charts, making DVBBS one of only 13 Canadian artists to ever chart at #1 on the Official UK Singles Chart. DVBBS also count 12 platinum singles  via "Tinted Eyes", "West Coast", "IDWK", “Tsunami” and “Not Going Home,” the latter of which also received a Juno Awards nomination for Dance Recording of the Year in 2018.

Their hit single came with "Tsunami". It had been promoted by Dutch DJ Sander van Doorn, although he denied being the producer. The song was confirmed by Pete Tong to be the work of DVBBS and Borgeous when Tong played the song on his BBC Radio 1 show on August 16, 2013. It was officially released on Sander Van Doorn's label Doorn Records on August 19, 2013. It also reached #1 on the Beatport 100. A vocal remix featuring British rapper Tinie Tempah entitled "Tsunami (Jump)" was released in Tempah's native United Kingdom in March 2014, on Ministry of Sound Recordings. DVBBS released their debut album, 'Sleep' on October 22, 2021.

Live performances

As one of the top live acts in dance music—clocking in more than 750 shows in the past five years—they have performed across the world’s top festivals. DVBBS have performed with Tiësto, NERVO, Steve Aoki, Martin Garrix, Showtek, Sander Van Doorn, DJ Snake and others.  They have performed at most major music festivals. The duo have been playing at mainstage Tomorrowland, Ultra Music Festival, and Creamfields, among many others.

Awards
2013: "One to Watch" award at the Canadian Urban Music Awards
2014: "Dance recording of the year" Nominee - Juno Awards 
2014: "Track of the year" - EMPO Awards
2018: "Dance recording of the year" Nominee - Juno Awards 
2019: "Single of the year" Canadian Music Week - Indie Awards 
2021 "Electronic/ Dance Artist/ Group or Duo of the Year" Canadian Music Week - Indie Awards

Discography

Studio albums

Extended plays

Singles

DJ Magazine Top 100 DJ

References

Musical groups from Ontario
Orangeville, Ontario
Canadian house music groups
Electronic dance music duos
Canadian musical duos
Canadian people of Dutch descent
Canadian people of Greek descent
Dance-pop groups
Electro house musicians
Future bass musicians
Musical groups established in 2012
2012 establishments in Ontario
Sibling musical duos
Spinnin' Records artists
Ultra Records artists
Universal Music Group artists
Progressive house musicians
Trap musicians (EDM)